is a Japanese manga series written and illustrated by Akio Chiba. It was serialized in Shueisha's shōnen manga magazine Weekly Shōnen Jump from 1973 to 1978, with its chapters collected in twenty-two tankōbon volumes.

The manga was adapted into a two-season anime television series co-produced by Eiken and Magic Bus, which aired on the anime satellite television network Animax from July to September 2005 (1st season) and from January to March 2006 (2nd season).

The series was released concurrently with Chiba's other major work, Captain, the other series for which he won the 22nd Shogakukan Manga Award for shōnen in 1977.

Plot
After fracturing a finger in a junior high school game, Takao Taniguchi is unable to play baseball. After entering Sumitani High School, he is constantly watching the baseball club even though he is unable to play. He catches the eye of the captain of the soccer club, and while he still has lingering hopes of joining the baseball club, he decides to join the soccer club. While he's a complete beginner, Taniguchi developed a strong spirit of hard work while in junior high school and his new teammates begin to see his potential. While he focuses all of his energy on soccer, he is unable to forget his youthful zeal for baseball and he begins umpiring baseball games in secret.

After someone leaks his secret to the captain of the soccer team, the captain becomes angry at him and Taniguchi decides that soccer is not really for him. At the recommendation of the captain, he resigns from the soccer club and joins the baseball club. The Sumitani baseball club would lose their big game every year due to the inexperience of the club members. After Taniguchi joined, however, the club begins to change for the better.

Characters
Takao Taniguchi

Pitcher (right-handed) and third baseman. He injured his finger in an accident when he was in junior high, and causing him to give up pitching because he thought it was too hard to pitch with a finger which caused him to be unable to pitch straight. However, through a great deal of effort and hard work, Taniguchi was able to overcome this and master the forkball (in the anime, his right index finger is crooked). After that, he had surgery to fix the injury to his finger (the anime has the order of events a bit different than in the manga).
Tadakoro

Plays catcher. Was the captain of the baseball club when Taniguchi joined.
Yutaka Kurabayashi

Plays catcher after Tadakoro. Usually bats third.
Nakayama

Plays pitcher (left-handed) and third baseman. One year older than Taniguchi, and wears glasses.
Ōta

Plays shortstop, and can run 100 m in 12 seconds. One year older than Taniguchi.
Yamaguchi

One year older than Taniguchi. Known for having a huge mole.
Yamamoto

One year older than Taniguchi. Plays right fielder, first baseman, and is a right-handed relief pitcher. Has an overbite.
Marui

One year younger than Taniguchi. Plays second baseman.
Yokoi

Same age as Taniguchi. Plays second baseman, switches to shortstop in the second year, and third baseman in the third year.
Handa

Same age as Taniguchi. Plays right fielder.
Tomuro

Same age as Taniguchi. Plays left fielder.
Suzuki

Same age as Taniguchi. Plays right fielder. Joined the baseball club at the same time as Handa.
Matsugawa

One year younger than Taniguchi. Plays third baseman.
Shimada

One year younger than Taniguchi. Plays center fielder.
Katō

One year younger than Taniguchi. Left-handed.

Anime

DVD releases

First season
Volume 1, AVBA-22361, ¥2940
Volume 2, AVBA-22362, ¥5040
Volume 3, AVBA-22363, ¥5040
Volume 4, AVBA-22364, ¥5040
Volume 5, AVBA-22365, ¥5040
Volume 6, AVBA-22366, ¥5040
Volume 7, AVBA-22367, ¥5040

Second season
Volume 1, AVBA-22701, ¥5040
Volume 2, AVBA-22702, ¥5040
Volume 3, AVBA-22703, ¥5040
Volume 4, AVBA-22704, ¥5040, July 26, 2006
Volume 5, AVBA-22705, ¥5040, August 30, 2006

References

External links
Official site 
Aex site 

1973 manga
Animax original programming
Anime series based on manga
Baseball in anime and manga
Eiken (studio)
Magic Bus (studio)
School life in anime and manga
Shueisha franchises
Shueisha manga
Shōnen manga
Winners of the Shogakukan Manga Award for shōnen manga